Ipidacrine (Neiromidin) is a drug first synthesized by the National Research Center for Biologically Active Compounds in the Russian Federation. This compound is a ring-constricted derivative of tacrine (Cognex).

Ipidacrine is a reversible acetylcholinesterase inhibitor used in memory disorders of different origins.

Ipidacrine directly stimulates impulse transmission in the central nervous system and neuromuscular synapses by blocking membrane potassium channels. Ipidacrine enhances not only choline, but also adrenaline, serotonin, histamine, and oxytocin effects on smooth muscle.

References 

Acetylcholinesterase inhibitors
Pyridines
Russian drugs